Vigilante Diaries is a 2016 action film directed by Christian Sesma and starring Paul Sloan, Quinton Rampage Jackson, Michael Jai White, Jason Mewes, and Michael Madsen. It was based on a 2013 web series of the same name.  Reviews were mostly negative.

Cast
 Paul Sloan as "The Vigilante"
 Quinton "Rampage" Jackson as "Wolfman"
 Kevin L. Walker as The Kid
 Michael Jai White as Barrington
 Jason Mewes as Michael Hanover
 Michael Madsen as Moreau
 Mike Hatton as Barry
 Noel Gugliemi as Nero
 Danny Trejo as Joe "Crazy Joe"
 James Russo as Mr. Hanover
 Arman Nshanian as Andreas
 Chasty Ballesteros as Raven
 Chavo Guerrero Jr. as "Tex-Mex"
 Jacqueline Lord as Jade
 Jessica Uberuaga as "Red"
 Mark Sherman as The Geek
 Mary Christina Brown as Swan
 Gary LeRoi Gray as Bass
 Steven Samblis as The High Roller
 Levy Tran as Kid 2.0

Production 
Vigilante Diaries originated as a web series which starred Jason Mewes, Paul Sloan, Kevin L. Walker, and Jacqueline Lord. Funding for the series was partially raised via the crowdfunding website Chill and the series aired on the USA Network in 2014, but was cancelled after only seven episodes. In 2014 production began on a film that would see Mewes, Walker, and Sloan returning. Other actors included Quinton Rampage Jackson, Michael Madsen, Michael Jai White, and Noel Gugliemi. Chavo Guerrero, a professional wrestler, played Tex-Mex. He was credited as Sal Guerrero.

Release 
The film was internationally distributed by CineTel Films. It was theatrically released in select theaters on June 24, 2016 and was released on VOD, DVD, and Blu-ray on July 5, 2016. Anchor Bay Entertainment handled the American distribution rights on DVD.

Reception 
The film was met with mostly negative reviews. The film received a 17% from critics on Rotten Tomatoes.  A reviewer for the Los Angeles Times wrote that "Vigilante Diaries never rises above what it is: a bunch of frenetic shootouts and fight scenes unencumbered by plot."  Edward Douglas of Film Journal International subtitles his review as "Writing and direction below the level of a standard videogame make for an almost unwatchable action thriller."  Kam Williams of Baret News Wire reviewed the film stating, "Despite the fact that this high-octane thriller never made any sense, I must confess that it held me in its thrall from start to finish purely on the strength of the over-stimulation of its incessant visual capture."

References

External links 
 
 
 

2016 films
2016 independent films
Films set in Los Angeles
Films shot in Los Angeles
American action films
American independent films
American vigilante films
CineTel Films films
2016 action films
2010s English-language films
2010s American films